The Triumph of the West was a thirteen part BBC television series, with an accompanying book, written and presented by John Roberts, historian and Warden of Merton College, Oxford, and first broadcast in 1985. The series was subtitled A View of History by John Roberts.

The series focuses on the origins and evolution of Western civilization, and the transformative challenges and influence it has exerted on the rest of the world. The thirteen one-hour episodes examined the socio-economic, political, and cultural movements that helped shape world history. The programmes painted a broad canvas but avoided simplistic solutions, encouraging viewers to think and form their own conclusions.

Episodes
 Episode 1 - Dangerous Gifts: the benefits and costs of Western influence
 Episode 2 - A New Direction: Influences from ancient Graeco-Roman and Judeo-Christian culture
 Episode 3 - The Heart of the West: The emergence of Europe from the Dark Ages
 Episode 4 - Islam: The World's Debate - Islam Vs. Judeo-Christianity
 Episode 5 - East of Europe: Byzantium
 Episode 6 - The Age of Exploration: Europe explores New Worlds
 Episode 7 - New Worlds
 Episode 8 - Age of Light: The Renaissance
 Episode 9 - Monuments to Progress: The Industrial Revolution 
 Episode 10 - India: The Ironies of Empire - India before, during and after colonial domination
 Episode 11 - The East is Red: China in the Twentieth Century
 Episode 12 - The Decline of the West (Two World Wars and The Great Depression)
 Episode 13 - Capitulations: Third World countries learn the price of dependency on the West

Reception
In his Guardian obituary of Roberts, fellow historian Jeremy Black noted that "Far from offering attractive simplicities, [Roberts] treated his audience as intelligent, and offered food for thought." In a critical article in The New York Times, John Corry thought that some of Roberts's argument was idiosyncratic, while noting that the opening episode "concludes with Mr. Roberts walking by the sea, wondering why no Arab dhows or Chinese junks have ever docked in the British port of Southampton. At least it is a provocative question."

See also
 People's Century
 Andrew Marr's History of Modern Britain
 A History of Britain

References

External links
British Universities Film and Video Council Retrieved 12 July 2020
The Triumph of the West at the BBC Retrieved 12 July 2020
New York Times Review By John Corry, September 17th 1986 Retrieved 12 July 2020

1985 British television series debuts
1985 British television series endings
1980s British documentary television series
English-language television shows
BBC television documentaries about history during the 20th Century
Historical television series
BBC television documentaries about history during the 18th and 19th centuries
BBC television documentaries about history during the 16th and 17th centuries
BBC television documentaries about medieval history
BBC television documentaries about prehistoric and ancient history